Palmeira is a town in the northwestern part of the island of Sal, Cape Verde. In 2010 its population was 1,420. The town is situated on the west coast, about 4 km west of the island capital Espargos.  Located at Baía de Palmeira, a small bay south of the village, it is home to the main port of the island of Sal. It is the third busiest port of Cape Verde in freight traffic.

History
A small settlement at the location of present Palmeira was observed by an English captain in 1720. It was mentioned as "Palmera" in the 1747 map by Jacques-Nicolas Bellin.

References

Geography of Sal, Cape Verde
Populated coastal places in Cape Verde
Towns in Cape Verde
Ports and harbours of Cape Verde